Coleophora ravillella is a moth of the family Coleophoridae. It is found in France, Spain and Italy.

The larvae feed on Onobrychis saxatilis and Onobrychis viciifolia.

References

ravillella
Moths of Europe
Moths described in 1961